Władysław Kulczyński (27 March 1854, Kraków – 9 December 1919, Kraków) was a Polish zoologist who specialised in arachnology.

Works

References

1854 births
1919 deaths
20th-century Polish zoologists
Polish arachnologists
Scientists from Kraków